Klaus Wunderlich (born 10 August 1951) is a German speed skater. He competed in three events at the 1976 Winter Olympics.

References

External links
 

1951 births
Living people
German male speed skaters
Olympic speed skaters of East Germany
Speed skaters at the 1976 Winter Olympics
Speed skaters from Berlin